David or Dai Rees may refer to:

Entertainment
 David Rees (author) (1936–1993), British children's author
 Dave Rees (born 1969), American drummer for SNFU and Wheat Chiefs
 David Rees (cartoonist) (born 1972), American cartoonist and television host

Sports
 Dai Rees (rugby, born c. 1885), Welsh rugby league footballer who played in the 1900s
 Dai Rees (rugby, 1920s), Welsh rugby union and rugby league footballer who played in the 1920s and 1930s, and coached rugby league in the 1930s to the 1960s
 Dai Rees (1913–1983), Welsh golfer
 David Rees (British cross-country skier) (born 1940), British cross-country skier
 David Rees (Canadian cross-country skier) (born 1943), Canadian cross-country skier
 Dai Rees (rugby union, born 1964), Welsh rugby union footballer who played in the 2000s, and coached in the 2000s and 2010s
 David Rees (rugby union, born 1974), English rugby union footballer who played in the 1990s and 2000s

Other
 David Rees (Y Cynhyrfwr) (1801–1869), Welsh Nonconformist minister and editor
 David Rees (mathematician) (1918–2013), British mathematician
 Sir Dai Rees (biochemist) (1936–2021), British biochemist and science administrator
 D. Ben Rees (David Benjamin Rees, born 1937), Welsh-language publisher and leader of the Welsh community in Liverpool
 David Rees (politician) (born 1957), member of the National Assembly for Wales
 David Rees (organic chemist) (born 1958), British organic chemist and chief scientific officer at Astex

See also
 David Rees-Williams, 1st Baron Ogmore (1903–1976), British politician
 Rees for people with this surname
 David Reese (disambiguation)
 David Reece, American singer